The discography of Dead or Alive, a British dance-pop group, consists of seven studio albums, five compilation albums, twenty eight singles, and two video albums.

Formed by frontman Pete Burns in 1980 in Liverpool, England, the band were first signed to the independent Rough Trade label in 1982, though moved to Epic Records the following year. Their debut album, Sophisticated Boom Boom, was released in 1984, producing a series of minor hits in the United Kingdom, most notably their version of "That's the Way (I Like It)" (originally recorded by KC and the Sunshine Band) which gave the band their first UK top 40 hit. Their second album, Youthquake (1985), reached the UK top 10 and brought the band international recognition, largely due to the success of the lead single, "You Spin Me Round (Like a Record)" which reached number one on the UK Singles Chart and number 11 on the U.S. Billboard Hot 100 in 1985. The album also contained three other UK top 40 hits: "Lover Come Back to Me", "In Too Deep", and "My Heart Goes Bang (Get Me to the Doctor)". The band's third album, Mad, Bad and Dangerous to Know, was released in 1986, but failed to continue the success of the previous album despite including two UK top 40 hits.

In 1988, the group released their fourth studio album, Nude, which again failed to sell in their native UK but brought the band success in Japan, spawning three number one singles including 1988's "Turn Around & Count 2 Ten". After the album's official release, two members of the group left with only singer Burns and percussionist Steve Coy remaining. Together, they released three more studio albums: Fan the Flame (Part 1) (1990), Nukleopatra (1995), Fragile (2000),

Albums

Studio albums

Compilation albums

Remix albums

Extended plays

Singles

As International Chrysis

Videography

Video albums

Music videos
 "I'd Do Anything"/1984
 "That's the Way (I Like It)"/1984
 "You Spin Me Round (Like a Record)"(**)/1984
 "Lover Come Back to Me"(**)/1985
 "In Too Deep"/1985
 "My Heart Goes Bang"/1985
 "Brand New Lover"(**)/1986
 "Something in My House"(**)/1987
 "Hooked on Love"/1987
 "I'll Save You All My Kisses"/1987
 "Turn Around and Count 2 Ten"(**)/1988
 "Come Home (With Me Baby)"(**)/1988
 "Baby Don't Say Goodbye (Live)"/1989
 "Your Sweetness (Is Your Weakness)/1990
 "Total Stranger"/1990
 "Rebel Rebel"/1994
 "Sex Drive" (1996 Dead Or Alive version)/1996
 "You Spin Me Round (Like a Record)" ('96 Remix)/1996
 "Hit & Run Lover"/2000
 "You Spin Me Round (Like a Record)" (2003 Remix)/2003

(**) These videos were re-edited to the 12" versions for club play.

References

Discographies of British artists
 
 
Pop music group discographies